Eddy Hamel (October 21, 1902 – April 30, 1943) was an American soccer player for Dutch club AFC Ajax. Hamel was the first Jewish player for Ajax.  He was murdered by the Nazis in 1943 in Auschwitz concentration camp.

Background
Hamel was born in New York City, New York. He was Jewish, as were his parents who were immigrants from the Netherlands. He moved to Amsterdam in his teenage years. In 1928 he married Johanna Wijnberg, and in 1938 they had twin boys, Paul and Robert.

Soccer career
As a youth, he played for Amsterdamsche FC (AFC).

He played for AFC Ajax from 1922 until 1930. He appeared in 125 matches as a right winger, and scoring 8 goals. Die-hard Ajax supporters call themselves "Joden"Dutch for "Jews"a nickname that reflects both the team's and the city's Jewish heritage. This nickname for Ajax fans dates back to before World War II, when Amsterdam was home to most of the Netherlands' 140,000 Jews.

Hamel became a first team regular for Ajax. He was the first Jewish player (as well as the first American) to play for first team Ajax. To date, only four other Jewish soccer players have followed in his footstepsJohnny Roeg, Bennie Muller, Sjaak Swart, and Daniël de Ridder. Hamel was a fan favorite, and was cited by pre-World War II club legend Wim Anderiesen as part of the strongest line-up he ever played with. He had his own fan club in the 1920s, which would line up on his side of the field at the beginning of every game, and then switch sides to be on his side of the field in the second half.

After his retirement as a player, Hamel managed Alcmaria Victrix for three years and continued to play in an Ajax veteran squad.

Arrest and killing by the Nazis
Hamel was also the club's only war victim who played for the first team of Ajax.

Local Fascist groups assisted in rounding up Jews after Nazi Germany invaded the Netherlands in May 1940. Despite his American citizenship, in late 1942 Hamel was detained by the Nazis because he was a Jew. He spent four months doing hard labor at Birkenau. After he was found to have a swollen mouth abscess during a Nazi inspection, the Nazis murdered him in the gas chambers in Auschwitz concentration camp on April 30, 1943.

In the TV documentary Auschwitz: The Forgotten Evidence, fellow inmate Leon Greenman said he was in front of Hamel when Hamel told him he had an abscess in his mouth, while in a regular medical selection queue, and that while Greenman passed that selection Hamel was sent to the gas chambers because of his abscess. He was one of several Jewish soccer playersmany of whom were Olympianswho were murdered by the Nazis.

See also
List of select Jewish football (association; soccer) players

References

External links

1902 births
1943 deaths
American soccer players
AFC Ajax players
American expatriate soccer players
Expatriate footballers in the Netherlands
American expatriate sportspeople in the Netherlands
Jewish American sportspeople
Jewish footballers
American people who died in Auschwitz concentration camp
American civilians killed in World War II
Soccer players from New York City
Dutch Jews who died in the Holocaust
Association football midfielders
20th-century American Jews